Acaena tenera, the lesser burnet, is a plant in the rose family Rosaceae. It is native to Patagonia and some subantarctic islands.

Description
Acaena tenera grows as a shrub-like herb. The species is similar to the greater burnet (Acaena magellanica), but smaller in size and growing lower to the ground. The leaves consist of up to six leaflets and are glossy green with a reddish border. The seeds are barbed and attach readily to fur and feathers.

Distribution and habitat
Acaena tenera is native to Patagonia, South Georgia and the Falkland Islands.

References

tenera
Flora of southern Chile
Flora of South Argentina
Flora of South Georgia Island
Flora of the Falkland Islands
Plants described in 1896